Stefan Persson (born October 26, 1974) was a Swedish bandy player who played for Hammarby IF Bandy as a defender. He bagan with Selångers SK where he stayed until the club were no longer strong, moving then to Hammarby. He retired in autumn 2008 and became the assistant coach of Hammarby.

Stefan has played for two clubs - Selånger SK (1993-1997) and Hammarby IF (1997-2008).

External links
  Stefan Persson
  Hammarby IF

Swedish bandy players
Living people
1974 births
Selånger SK Bandy players
Hammarby IF Bandy players